Stepan Nercessian (born 2 December 1953) is a Brazilian actor and politician of Armenian descent.
Nercessian was born in Cristalina, Goiás; his career began in the late 1960s, in the film Marcelo Zona Sul. He also acted on stage and television, having worked for Rede Globo from 1971 to 2018.

Political career 
In 2004 Nercessian was elected councilman of the city of Rio de Janeiro, for the Popular Socialist Party ; being re-elected in 2008. In the 2010 Brazilian general election, he was elected federal deputy representing the state of Rio de Janeiro with 84,006 votes.

Selected filmography 
 1970 : Marcelo Zona Sul          : Marcelo
 1971 : Pra Quem Fica, Tchau        Lui
 1971 : André, a Cara e a Coragem : André
1972  : Revólveres Não Cospem Flores
 1973 : Amante Muito Louca        : Junior
 1973 : Primeiros Momentos        : Tatá
 1973 : Como É Boa Nossa Empregada: Bebeto
 1973 : Xica da Silva : José
 1977 : Lúcio Flávio, o Passageiro da Agonia : the suicidal
 1999 : Orfeu : Pacheco
 2003 : God Is Brazilian : Baudelé
 2014 : Julio Sumiu : Delegado Barriga
 2014 : Rio, I Love You (Rio, Eu Te Amo) : Porteiro (segment "Dona Fulana")
 2014:  Trash
 2015 : Bach in Brazil : Director

References 

1953 births
Living people
Brazilian actors
Brazilian people of Armenian descent
Cidadania politicians
Members of the Chamber of Deputies (Brazil) from Rio de Janeiro (state)
Brazilian actor-politicians
20th-century Brazilian people